John Hampton Stennis (March 2, 1935 – September 5, 2013) was an American lawyer and Democratic politician who served as a member of the Mississippi House of Representatives. The son of U.S. Senator John C. Stennis, he was first elected in 1969 to succeed Russell C. Davis, who was elected mayor of Jackson. In 1978, he ran for Congress in Mississippi's 4th congressional district but lost to Jon Hinson.

On September 17, 1966, he was married to the former Martha Rozelle Allred at the Presbyterian church in Collins, Mississippi.

References

1935 births
2013 deaths
American people of Scottish descent
Democratic Party members of the Mississippi House of Representatives
People from Kemper County, Mississippi
Princeton University alumni
University of Virginia School of Law alumni
20th-century American lawyers
20th-century American politicians